Dadı is a Turkish remake of The Nanny, one of the most successful sitcoms in the United States of the 1990s. The program is set in the wealthy neighborhood of Nişantaşı, Istanbul.

It was broadcast to countries outside Turkey.

Plot
Melek Özbal [Fran Fine] (Gülben Ergen), fresh out of her job as a bridal consultant in her boyfriend's shop is working as a door-to-door cosmetics saleswoman when she stumbles onto the opportunity to become the nanny to the children of a wealthy media tycoon, Ömer Giritli [Maxwell Sheffield] (Kenan Işık). Once Melek realizes Giritli is not only wealthy but also a widower, she eagerly takes the job.

It's a situation of blue-collar meets blue blood, as Melek gives the prim-and-proper and his problem children a dose of "street-smart logic," helping them become a healthy, happy family. Melek discovers she's got a lot of work to do with the three Giritli youngsters. Dilara [Margaret "Maggie" Sheffield] (Sinem Kobal) is a pretty, yet insecure teenager in need of a boost in self-esteem. 
Convinced he doesn't need a nanny, Tolga [Brighton Sheffield] (Yaşar Abravaya) is a master at mischievous pranks and tormenting his sisters. Eight-year-old Duygu [Grace Sheffield] (Gökçe Uzuner) is a serious child who dotes on her daily sessions with her therapist. Proudly running the Giritli household is the butler Pertev [Niles] (Haldun Dormen), who watches all events with a bemused eye and levels problems with his quick wit. Pertev quickly recognizes Melek's gift at bringing warmth back to the family. Suzan [C.C. Babcock] (Seray Sever), Ömer's socialite business associate, views Melek with a mixture of skepticism and jealousy, as she has designs on the very available Giritli herself.

Apart from the name changes for the characters, and changes for the locations in Turkey, the episodes are identical to their American equivalents.

Cast
Melek Özbal (Fran Fine) - Gülben Ergen
Ömer Giritli (Maxwell Sheffield) - Kenan Işık
Pertev (Niles) - Haldun Dormen
Ms Suzan (C.C. Babbcock) - Seray Sever
Dilara Giritli (Maggie Sheffield) - Sinem Kobal
Tolga Giritli (Brighton Sheffield) - Yasar Abravaya
Duygu Giritli (Grace Sheffield) - Gökçe Uzuner

External links 
Dadı official home page
Dadı at the Internet Movie Database
Dadı

Turkish culture
Television series by Sony Pictures Television
Turkish television series endings
Television shows set in Istanbul
Television series produced in Istanbul
Turkish television series based on American television series